Epigomphus sulcatistyla is a species of dragonfly in the family Gomphidae. It is endemic to Mexico, where it is found in the Sierra de los Tuxtlas of southern Veracruz state. Its natural habitats are subtropical or tropical moist lowland forests and rivers. It is threatened by habitat loss.

Sources

Gomphidae
Endemic insects of Mexico
Los Tuxtlas
Taxonomy articles created by Polbot
Insects described in 1989